Oliva barbadensis is a species of sea snail, a marine gastropod mollusk in the family Olividae, the olives.

Description
Original description: "Shell of medium size for subgenus, heavy, thickened, fusiform in shape, body somewhat inflated, wider at midsection than at shoulder; spire elevated, protracted; color yellow to yellow-tan, overlaid with variable amounts of fine brown triangles in a netted pattern; some specimens with large zig-zag areas of bright yellow; body whorl with two bands of darker brown zig-zags; spire whorls with tan-colored callus; shoulder and edge of suture with pale blue patches, corresponding to sutural scalloping pattern; protoconch large; interior of aperture white; columellar area white with 18 to 25 thin plicae. 
Size: approximately 40 to 50 mm. in length.
Holotype: Length 50 mm, width 21 mm, trawled from 200 meters depth
off St. James, Barbados Island, by research vessel. USNM 841427.
Discussion: Oliva barbadensis is closest to Oliva drangai from Tobago, but differs in being a larger, more inflated species, and by having a much darker and more elaborate color pattern."

Distribution

This marine species occurs off French Guiana.

Etymology
"Named for Barbados Island, West Indies, the type locality."

Habitat
"This new species is one of the deepest-dwelling olives in the western Atlantic 
and is known only from deep water surrounding the Barbados seamount."This carnivorous, scavenging Olive responds readily to baited traps.

References

La famille des Olividae Latreille, 1825 (Neogastropoda). Le genre Oliva Bruguière, 1789, aux Antilles et en Guyane françaises. Description de Oliva lilacea nov. sp. Bulletin de la Société Linnéenne de Bordeaux 41(4) "2013": 437-454, sér. 148, nouvelle série

barbadensis